Maratecoara is a genus of killifish in the family Rivulidae. These annual killifish are endemic to seasonal pools, swamps and lagoons in the upper Araguaia–Tocantins and middle Xingu river basins in Brazil. Most are from savanna regions, but M. gesmonei is from the Amazon rainforest.

The males are mottled or spotted orange-red and turquoise-blue, and have long, pointed fins. The much duller females have "normal" fins.

Species
Maratecoara and the closely related Papiliolebias, Pituna, Plesiolebias and Stenolebias form a clade, Plesiolebiasini.

There are currently 4 recognized species in Maratecoara:

 Maratecoara formosa W. J. E. M. Costa & G. C. Brasil, 1995
 Maratecoara gesmonei D. T. B. Nielsen, Martins & Britzke, 2014
 Maratecoara lacortei Lazara, 1991
 Maratecoara splendida W. J. E. M. Costa, 2007

References

Rivulidae
Freshwater fish genera